Tetragonotheca is a genus of North American plants in the family Asteraceae. Nerveray is a common name for plants in this genus.

 Species
 Tetragonotheca helianthoides L. - MS AL GA FL NC SC TN VA
 Tetragonotheca ludoviciana (Torr. & A.Gray) A.Gray ex E.Hall - TX LA AR
 Tetragonotheca parviflora Jacq. - West Indies
 Tetragonotheca repanda (Buckley) Small - TX
 Tetragonotheca texana Engelm. & A.Gray ex A.Gray & Engelm. - TX, Coahuila, Nuevo León, Tamaulipas, Jalisco, Colima
 formerly included
see Guizotia Rumfordia 
 Tetragonotheca abyssinica - Guizotia abyssinica 
 Tetragonotheca guatemalensis - Rumfordia guatemalensis

References

Millerieae
Asteraceae genera
Flora of North America
Taxa named by Carl Linnaeus